The Dehlavieh (also Dehlavie, Dehlaviyeh, etc) is an Iranian Anti-tank guided missile made by the Ministry of Defence and Armed Forces Logistics (Iran).

It is considered to be an unlicensed copy of the 9M133 Kornet, which has the same guidance, outer appearance and published performance.

History
In March 2023, it's reported that several Dehlaviehs were confiscated by American and British troops from being transported to the Houthis. The incident took place in February 2023 after an American aircraft conducted surveillance on a boat coming from Iran.

Design
The Dehlavieh has  a range of 5–6 km. Its armor penetration is said to be more than 1,000 meters.

In 2018, it's reported that the Dehlavieh can have the “RU244TK” and “RU150TK” thermal imaging cameras attached.

Operators

 https://21stcenturyasianarmsrace.com/2021/07/28/this-iranian-missile-launcher-is-a-world-of-trouble/
 : Used by Government of National Accord

Non-State Actors
 Izz ad-Din al-Qassam Brigades

References

Post–Cold War weapons of Iran
Post–Cold War military equipment of Iran
Anti-tank guided missiles of Iran
Military equipment introduced in the 2010s